The Best of Morphine, 1992–1995 is a greatest hits compilation by alternative rock band Morphine, released by Rykodisc in February 2003.

The Best of Morphine, 1992–1995 chronicles the band's first four albums: Good, Cure For Pain, Yes and B-sides and Otherwise, and includes two previously unreleased tracks: “Pretty Face”, a dark atmospheric ballad recorded live in one take at Morphine’s studio in Cambridge, MA, and “Jack and Tina”, described by Morphine drummer Billy Conway as “the most beautiful bridge Mark Sandman ever wrote.”  The B-side of the long-out-of-print 1000-piece pressing of “Cure for Pain” on 7" vinyl called “Sexy Christmas Baby Mine” (1993) rounds out the adventure through Morphine musical history.  The CD is enhanced with a video of the song “Shame”, recorded at the Masquerade in Atlanta.

In Europe, the album was released as simply The Best Of Morphine and also included a song from Like Swimming and two songs from The Night. These had to be omitted on the US release because The Night was released by DreamWorks, not Rykodisc, in North America. In Europe, all Morphine albums appeared on Rykodisc, which made it possible to release the Best Of album with a career spanning track listing.

South American editions are the same as the European version, but also include the song "Early to Bed" from Like Swimming, making it a 17 track compilation.

Track listing

USA edition

European edition 

The South American edition uses the track list of the European edition, but adds "Early to Bed" (from Like Swimming) as track 10, and pushes the rest of the tracks down accordingly, for a total of 17.

Personnel 
Adapted from the album liner notes.

Morphine
 Mark Sandman – vocals, 2-string slide bass, tritar, guitar, piano, Chamberlin, organ
 Dana Colley – baritone saxophone, tenor saxophone, double saxophone
 Billy Conway – drums, percussion

Additional musicians
 Jerome Deupree – drums on "Buena", "Candy", "Have a Lucky Day", "I'm Free Now", "Thursday" and "Pretty Face"
 Charlie Kohlhase – baritone saxophone on "Jack and Tina" 

Technical personnel
 Mark Sandman – producer 
 Paul Q. Kolderie – producer 
 Toby Mountain – mastering
 Steven Jurgensmeyer – design
 Ferenc Dobronyi – design
 Dana Colley – woodcuts
 Lana Kaplan – band photography

References

External links
 RYKODISC Morphine Catalog

2003 greatest hits albums
Morphine (band) albums
Rykodisc compilation albums